German submarine U-57 was a Type IIC U-boat of Nazi Germany's Kriegsmarine that served in the Second World War. She was built by Deutsche Werke in Kiel as yard number 256. Ordered on 17 June 1937, she was laid down on 14 September, launched on 3 September 1938 and commissioned on 29 December under the command of Oberleutnant zur See Claus Korth.

U-56 was initially part of the 5th U-boat Flotilla during her training period, until 31 December 1939, when she was reassigned to the 1st U-boat Flotilla for operations.

Design
German Type IIC submarines were enlarged versions of the original Type IIs. U-57 had a displacement of  when at the surface and  while submerged. She had two shafts and two  propellers.

U-57 was fitted with three  torpedo tubes at the bow, five torpedoes or up to twelve Type A torpedo mines, and a  anti-aircraft gun. The boat had a complement of 25.

Service history

First, second and third patrols
The boat's first patrol was brief and passed without incident. For her second sortie, she departed Kiel on 5 September 1939, but went no further than the Kattegat. Her third effort was as far as the waters separating Orkney and Shetland, but success continued to elude her.

Fourth and fifth patrols
It was more of the same for her fourth and fifth patrols, although her activity was centred more in the southern North Sea.

Sixth and seventh patrols

Sally number seven began with the boat's departure from Wilhelmshaven on 8 February 1940. On the 14th, she attacked the Gretafield southeast of Noss Head. The burnt-out ship, which had been abandoned, drifted ashore at Dunbeath in Caithness. She broke in two and was declared a total loss.

U-57 was one of six U-boats that took part in Operation Nordmark; carrying out reconnaissance in the area of the Orkney and Shetland Islands for a subsequently unsuccessful sortie by the German capital ships Scharnhorst, Gneisenau and Admiral Hipper between 18 and 20 February 1940.

Eighth and ninth patrols

Patrol number nine saw the boat sweeping the area of the North Sea off the English/Scottish borders, Orkney and Shetland and all points east, with no result.

Tenth patrol

She then docked at the recently captured port of Lorient on the French Atlantic coast on 7 August.

11th patrol
Although her base had changed, the boat's area of operations had not. As sort of a farewell gift, she sank the Pecten in the evening of the 25th; the ship went down in 90 seconds.

Training duties
Returning to Germany, she was relegated to duties as a training boat and sank after a collision with the Norwegian ship Rona at Brunsbüttel (northwest of Hamburg) on 3 September 1940 with the loss of six of her 25 crew members. She was raised, repaired and returned to service in January 1941.

With the end of the war in sight, she was scuttled on 3 May 1945 at Kiel.

Summary of raiding history

References

Notes

Citations

Bibliography

External links
 
 

1938 ships
German Type II submarines
U-boats commissioned in 1938
World War II submarines of Germany
Ships built in Kiel
U-boats sunk in 1940
U-boats sunk in collisions
Operation Regenbogen (U-boat)
Maritime incidents in September 1940
Maritime incidents in May 1945